The 2010 Safari Sevens were the 15th annual edition of the Safari Sevens. The event attracted 21,000 spectators and the gate receipts were KSh.17 million/= (compared to KSh.12 million/= from 15,000 spectators in 2009). Georgia, Botswana and Morocco pulled out at the last minute; Rwanda and Shujaa filled the gaps left by these withdrawals.

Match Officials 
The 2010 tournament match officials

Pool stages

Pool A

Pool B

Pool C

Pool D

Knockout stage

Cup

Plate

Bowl

Shield

References 

2010
2010 in African rugby union
2010 rugby sevens competitions